Esteban Andres Mujica Peralta (born 24 February 1985) is a Chilean badminton player. He competed at the 2007 and 2011 Pan American Games.

Achievements

BWF International Challenge/Series 
Men's doubles

Mixed doubles

  BWF International Challenge tournament
  BWF International Series tournament
  BWF Future Series tournament

References

External links 
 

1985 births
Living people
Chilean male badminton players
Badminton players at the 2007 Pan American Games
Badminton players at the 2011 Pan American Games
Pan American Games competitors for Chile
Competitors at the 2010 South American Games
People from San Antonio Province
21st-century Chilean people
20th-century Chilean people